Gregory L. Charvat is author of Small and Short-Range Radar Systems, Co-Founder of Butterfly Network Inc, and advisor to the Camera Culture Group at Massachusetts Institute of Technology MIT Media Lab.

Career 

Charvat is best known for his through-wall radar imaging system and his project-based MIT short-course on radar, where each student builds their own radar system.  This radar course has been adopted by numerous other universities and institutions. Charvat is also well known in the hacker and maker community for developing radar devices and imaging systems in his garage.

Charvat grew up in the metro Detroit area, where he would take apart old televisions & radios. He built amateur radio equipment in high school, a radio telescope for which he won second place at the 1997 International Science and Engineering Fair in Louisville, KY, and developed many radar sensors in college. He earned PhD (2007), MSc (2003), and BSc (2002) degrees in electrical engineering from Michigan State University. He was a member of the technical staff at MIT Lincoln Laboratory from Sept 2007 to Nov 2011, and has taught short radar courses at MIT where his ‘Build a Small Radar Sensor...’ course was top-ranked MIT Professional Education course in 2011.

Charvat has authored or co-authored numerous journals, proceedings, magazine articles, and seminars on topics including applied electromagnetics, synthetic aperture radar (SAR), and phased array radar systems, radio frequency (RF) and analog design. He has developed numerous rail SAR imaging sensors, phased array radar systems, impulse radar systems and other radar sensors, and as well has designed his own amateur radio station. Charvat won best 2010 paper at the Military Sensing Symposia (MSS) Tri-Services Radar Symposium for his work on through wall radar.  For fun he develops vacuum tube audio equipment and restores antique radios and watches, among hobbies.

Recently, Gregory Charvat provided explanations of advanced sensing technologies that the general public could understand during a series of interviews on the missing Malaysian Flight 370.

Sky News Television on Sunday morning 3/23/14 (afternoon in UK).

Malaysia's local NPR-style radio station Business FM 89.9, on 3/24/14.

Newstalk1010 Moore in the Morning with John Moore (Toronto Canada) on 3/24/14

The Arlene Bynon Show on SiriusXM Canada on 3/18/14.

Gregory Charvat is also a contributing author to Hack-a-Day blog, writing on the subject of using small radar technology for your next project
http://hackaday.com/2014/02/24/guest-post-try-radar-for-your-next-project/

and how Synthetic Aperture Radar imaging works:
http://hackaday.com/2014/03/17/radar-imaging-in-your-garage-synthetic-aperture-radar/

Gregory L. Charvat is a visiting research scientist at MIT Media Lab.

Charvat is the Series Editor of the "Modern and Practical Approaches to Electrical Engineering," book series. Author Albert Sabban published the most recent part in the series, "Low-Visibility Antennas for Communication Systems," on September 18, 2015.

References

9. Charvat, Gregory.(2015-10-23)."Time-of-Flight Microwave Camera" Scientific Reports 5, Article number: 14709 (2015). Retrieved 2015-11-23.

10. Venkratraman, Vijee. (2015-10-06). "A camera than can see through walls" The Boston Globe. MIT Media Lab. Retrieved 2015-11-23.

11. Ackerman, Evan. (2015-10-14). "MIT's 3-D Microwave Camera Can See Through Walls" Spectrum.ieee.org. Tech Talk. Retrieved 2015-11-23.

12. Muoio, Danielle. (2015-10-15). "This camera can see through walls and could help driverless cars navigate fog" Techinside.io. Tech Insider. Retrieved 2015-11-23.

13. Sorrel, Charlie. (2015-10-23). "MIT's New Microwave Camera Can See Through Walls" fastcoexist.com. Exist. Retrieved 2015-11-23.

14. Sabban, Albert. (2015-9-18). "Low-Visibility Antennas for Communication Systems." crcpress.com. CRC Net Base. Retrieved 2015-11-23.

External links

 Scientific Reports, October 2015. Retrieved 2015-11-23.
 http://cameraculture.media.mit.edu/time-of-flight-microwave-camera/ Retrieved 2015-11-23.

V. Venkatraman, “A camera that can see through walls.”  Beta Boston, the Boston Globe, October 6, 2015. Retrieved 2015-11-23.

E. Ackerman, “MIT’s 3-D Microwave Camera Can See Through Walls.”  IEEE Spectrum, October 2015. Retrieved 2015-11-23.

D. Muoio, “This camera can see through walls and could help driverless cars navigate fog.”  Tech Insider, October 15, 2015. Retrieved 2015-11-23.

C. Sorrel, “MIT’s new microwave camera can see through walls.” Co.Exist, Fast Company, October 23, 2015. Retrieved 2015-11-23.
 https://www.crcpress.com/Low-Visibility-Antennas-for-Communication-Systems/Sabban/9781482246438 CRC Net Bases. September 18, 2015. Retrieved 2015-11-23.

Living people
Michigan State University alumni
Synthetic aperture radar
MIT Lincoln Laboratory people
Year of birth missing (living people)